Eupanacra treadawayi is a moth of the  family Sphingidae. It is known from the Philippines.

The length of the forewings is 26.5–28 mm. It is similar to Eupanacra angulata, except for differences in the tegulae (which have light yellow metallic scales) and the upperside of the abdomen (which has silvery scales), as well as the form of the forewing. Differences on the upperside of the forewing are limited to the form of the discal dot and several of the lines. The hindwing underside has a bright discal spot consisting of silver and gold scales.

References

Eupanacra
Moths described in 1995